Manjeet Dharampal Choudhary (born 12 September 1981) is an Indian politician from the Bharatiya Janata Party and a member of the Rajasthan Legislative Assembly representing the Mundawar Vidhan Sabha constituency of Rajasthan.

References 

Members of the Rajasthan Legislative Assembly
Bharatiya Janata Party politicians from Rajasthan
1968 births
Living people